is a Japanese voice actor affiliated with Sigma Seven.

Filmography

Anime
AKB0048 - Leader
Aikatsu! - Johnny Bepp
Aikatsu Friends! - Masamune Yūki, Penne
Rec - Fumihiko Matsumaru
AKB0048 Next Stage - Leader
A Certain Scientific Railgun - Tsuguo Hebitani
Birdy the Mighty: Decode - Detective (ep7)
BNA: Brand New Animal - Fumio Mimura
Buso Renkin - Rintaro Inukai
Captain Earth - Toshiaki Manatsu
Eureka Seven Ao - Yamaoka
Free! Timeless Medley - Toraichi Matsuoka
Hanasaku Iroha - Takuzō Misaki
Highschool DxD - Bikou
Infinite Stratos - Dan Gotanda
Initial D: Fourth Stage - Man C (ep1)
JoJo's Bizarre Adventure: Stardust Crusaders - Oingo
Jormungand - Lee
Legend of Mana: The Teardrop Crystal - Mark
Maria the Virgin Witch - Donny
New Game!! - Kaijin Insecticide Man (ep9)
Parasyte -the maxim- - A
Plunderer - Freidkam Von Lightning
School Rumble - Hayato Tani, Ryūhei Suga, Additional Voices
School Rumble: 2nd Semester - Dentaku, Hayato Tani, Ryūhei Suga
Rockman EXE Axess - FlashMan, Assistant A (eps. 1-2), Narration (ep. 6), Station Worker B (ep. 7), Match Operator (ep. 10), Controller B (ep. 12), Butcher (ep. 16), Security Navi B (ep. 19), Staff B (ep. 24), Official (e.g. customs) (ep. 25), Employee (ep. 28), Assistant (eps. 29, 33), Staff C (ep. 31), Police Officer B (ep. 34), Navi 3 (ep. 38), Driver (ep. 39), Worker C (ep. 40), Management Navi (ep. 41), GateballMan (ep. 43), Nation B Staff (ep. 47)
Rockman EXE Stream - FlashMan, Staff B (ep. 2), Agent A (ep. 2), Director (ep. 3), Staff (ep. 4), Deliveryman (ep. 6), Office Staff A (eps. 8, 26), Cameraman (ep. 10), Security Guard (ep. 13), Judge Navi (ep. 15), Staff A (ep. 16), Assistant A (eps. 18, 39), Craftsman (ep. 19), Employee A (ep. 21), Broker (ep. 27), MP1 (ep. 29), Operator A (ep. 30, 45), Obserber B (ep. 32)
Rockman EXE Beast - Copyroid (ep. 4), Office Staff A (ep. 9, 20, 24-25)
Wandering Witch: The Journey of Elaina - Elaina's Father
Yashahime: Princess Half-Demon - Miroku (replacing Kōji Tsujitani)
Zoids Wild Zero - Buzz Cunningham

Tokusatsu
Kaizoku Sentai Gokaiger - Almadon (ep. 17)
Tokumei Sentai Go-Busters - Parabolaloid (ep. 16)

OVA
Detective Conan: Flower of Fantasista - Mizushima
School Rumble: Extra Class - Hayato Tani, Ryūhei Suga

Video Games
Dissidia Final Fantasy: Opera Omnia - Layle
Eureka Seven Vol. 2: The New Vision - Bing
Final Fantasy Crystal Chronicles: The Crystal Bearers - Layle
Galaxy Angel: Eternal Lovers - Rowil
Puyo Puyo Fever - Oshare Bones
Puyo Puyo Fever 2 - Oshare Bones
Puyo Puyo! 15th Anniversary - Oshare Bones

Dubbing

Live-action
Event 15, Oldsman (Josh Stewart)
Get Smart, Bruce (Masi Oka)
Get Smart's Bruce and Lloyd: Out of Control, Bruce (Masi Oka)
The Matrix Reloaded, Axel (Leigh Whannell), Twins
NCIS: Los Angeles, Eric Beale (Barrett Foa)
Somewhere, Sammy (Chris Pontius)

Animation
We Bare Bears, Ice Bear

References

External links
Official profile at Sigma Seven 

1975 births
Living people
Japanese male video game actors
Japanese male voice actors
Male voice actors from Tokyo
20th-century Japanese male actors
21st-century Japanese male actors
Sigma Seven voice actors

is:Infinite Stratos